"Lady (Hear Me Tonight)" is a song by French house duo Modjo, written and performed by vocalist Yann Destagnol and producer Romain Tranchart. It was released on 19 June 2000 as the lead single from the duo's self-titled debut studio album (2001). It became a major worldwide success, topping at least 10 music charts, including the national charts of Ireland, Italy, Spain, Switzerland, and the United Kingdom. It also topped the US Billboard Hot Dance Club Play chart in January 2001.

Content
"Lady (Hear Me Tonight)" is written in the key of D-flat major and proceeds at a moderately fast tempo of 128 beats per minute, in common time. It features a guitar sample of "Soup for One" performed by Chic, as written by Nile Rodgers and Bernard Edwards. In 2011, Chic added the song to their concert setlist, which is performed as a mash-up song with "Soup for One".

The single includes the original version of the track, plus an acoustic version, both performed by Modjo. Remixes have been provided by Harry Romero, Roy Davis, Jr. and Danny Tenaglia.

Release
The song debuted at number one in the United Kingdom on 10 September 2000, where it stayed for two weeks to become the sixteenth-best-selling single of 2000. It also reached number one in seven other European countries and became a top-ten hit in several others, including Australia, Canada and New Zealand. In the United States, the song peaked at number 81 on the Billboard Hot 100 and number one on the Hot Dance Club Play chart. As of 2017, the single has sold two million copies worldwide.

Critical reception and legacy
A reviewer from Daily Record wrote that it is a "brilliant" house track. Australian music channel Max placed the song at number 790 in their list of the "1000 Greatest Songs of All Time" in 2012. Mixmag included "Lady (Hear Me Tonight)" in their list of "The 30 Best Vocal House Anthems Ever" in 2018. Insider put the song on their list of the "102 Songs Everyone Should Listen to in Their Lifetime" in 2019.

Music video
The accompanying music video for the song was directed by François Nemeta and was filmed in June 2000 in various locations in Quebec, Canada.

The video starts off with a teenager with a shaved head who walks into a restaurant where his friends, a teenage couple, are waiting for him. The three pool all their money together, take it to a used car dealership, buy a car and drive it to a country fair. The three watch a band playing in a bar and then grab their instruments during a break. Their efforts aren't appreciated, and the teenager with the shaved head is hit with a bottle thrown from the crowd, after which they are chased out. They then sneak into a motel, where they proceed to shower and sleep. The next morning, they are chased out by the hotel manager, and drive until their car breaks down. The girl leads the boys into the woods, and they come across a cliff with a view of a city, which they gaze at in awe as the sun sets.

Track listings

 European CD single
 "Lady (Hear Me Tonight)" (radio edit) – 3:46
 "Lady (Hear Me Tonight)" – 5:05

 European 12-inch vinyl
A1. "Lady (Hear Me Tonight)" – 5:05
A2. "Lady (Hear Me Tonight)" (radio edit) – 3:46
B1. "Lady" (Roy's Universal Soldiers Mix) – 5:10
B2. "Lady" (acoustic) – 3:13

 UK CD single
 "Lady (Hear Me Tonight)" (radio edit) – 3:46
 "Lady (Hear Me Tonight)" (original mix) – 5:05
 "Lady (Hear Me Tonight)" (Acoustique Mix) – 3:13
 "Lady (Hear Me Tonight)" (Roy's Universal Soldiers Mix) – 5:10
 "Lady (Hear Me Tonight)" (CD-Rom video)

 UK cassette single
A1. "Lady (Hear Me Tonight)" (radio edit) – 3:46
A2. "Lady (Hear Me Tonight)" (original mix) – 5:05
B1. "Lady (Hear Me Tonight)" (remix) – 7:07

 Australasian CD single
 "Lady (Hear Me Tonight)" (radio edit) – 3:46
 "Lady (Hear Me Tonight)" – 5:05
 "Roller Coaster" – 6:08
 "Lady (Hear Me Tonight)" (remix) – 7:07

 US CD single
 "Lady (Hear Me Tonight)" (original mix)
 "Lady (Hear Me Tonight)" (Harry "Choo Choo" Romero's Titanium Dub)
 "Lady (Hear Me Tonight)" (Roy's Universal Soldiers Mix)
 "Lady" (acoustic)
 "Lady (Hear Me Tonight)" (video)

Charts

Weekly charts

Year-end charts
{|class="wikitable sortable plainrowheaders" style="text-align:center"
|+2000 year-end chart performance for "Lady (Hear Me Tonight)"
!Chart (2000)
!Position
|-
!scope="row"|Australia (ARIA)
|60
|-
!scope="row"|Belgium (Ultratop 50 Flanders)
|55
|-
!scope="row"|Belgium (Ultratop 50 Wallonia)
|24
|-
!scope="row"|Denmark (IFPI)
|25
|-
!scope="row"|Europe (Eurochart Hot 100)
|13
|-
!scope="row"|France (SNEP)
|21
|-
!scope="row"|Germany (Official German Charts)
|52
|-
!scope="row"|Iceland (Íslenski Listinn Topp 40)
|37
|-
!scope="row"|Ireland (IRMA)
|27
|-
!scope="row"|Netherlands (Dutch Top 40)
|21
|-
!scope="row"|Netherlands (Single Top 100)
|36
|-
!scope="row"|Romania (Romanian Top 100)
|8
|-
!scope="row"|Spain (PROMUSICAE)<ref> Click on Música grabada.</ref>
|8
|-
!scope="row"|Sweden (Sverigetopplistan)
|61
|-
!scope="row"|Switzerland (Schweizer Hitparade)
|6
|-
!scope="row"|UK Singles (OCC)
|16
|}

Certifications

Release history

Austin Mahone version

"Lady (Hear Me Tonight)" was covered by American singer Austin Mahone featuring rapper Pitbull under the shortened title "Lady". It was released on 10 February 2017 along with its lyrics video.

Background
The song peaked at number one on the Billboard'' Dance Club Songs. This earned Mahone's first number one single in the US. On New Year's Eve, Mahone performed "Lady" on Pitbull's New Year's Revolution.

Track listings

Charts

Weekly charts

Year-end charts

See also
 List of Romanian Top 100 number ones of the 2000s

References

2000 songs
2000 debut singles
Barclay (record label) singles
European Hot 100 Singles number-one singles
Irish Singles Chart number-one singles
MCA Records singles
Modjo songs
Number-one singles in Greece
Number-one singles in Hungary
Number-one singles in Portugal
Number-one singles in Romania
Number-one singles in Scotland
Number-one singles in Spain
Number-one singles in Switzerland
Songs written by Bernard Edwards
Songs written by Nile Rodgers
UK Singles Chart number-one singles